Brachysaurana is an extinct genus of marine lizard belonging to the mosasaur family. It is classified as part of the Mosasaurinae subfamily, alongside genera like Mosasaurus and Clidastes. Although traditionally synonymized with Prognathodon, recent cladistic studies do not find it closely related to the Prognathodon type species to the exclusion of other prognathodontin mosasaurines.

References

Apex predators
Mosasaurines
Mosasaurs of North America